Bidingen is a municipality in the district of Ostallgäu in Bavaria in Germany.

Places in the municipality 
Gemarkungen
Bernbach
Bidingen
other
Geblatsried
Geislatsried
Königsried
Ob
Tremmelschwang
Weiler
Ämbisried
Ruderatsried
Ebenried
Korbsee
Langweid
Etzlensberg

References 

Ostallgäu